Balkan Horor Rok II is a live album by the Serbian rock band Električni Orgazam. The album, released on cassette only, is the second part of the live recordings released as a part of the compilation Seks, droga, nasilje i strah / Balkan Horor Rock.

Track listing 
 "Bomba" / "Nezgodno" – 4:38
 "Devojke" – 1:37
 "Odelo" – 2:31
 "Pojmove ne povezujem" – 2:47
 "Dokolica" – 2:24
 "Hajde bejbe (daj da vidim sad)" – 3:26
 "Svecane bele kosulje" – 4:59
 "Mjau mjau" – 3:34
 "Kapetan Esid" – 4:11
 "Lui Lui" – 4:29

Personnel 
 Srđan Gojković Gile – guitar, vocals
 Branislav Petrović Banana – guitar, vocals
 Goran Čavajda Čavke – drums
 Zoran Radomirović Švaba – bass

References 
 Discography page at the official website

1993 live albums
Električni Orgazam live albums